The 1998 Gloucester City Council election took place on 5 May 1998 to elect members of Gloucester City Council in England.

Results 

|}

Ward results

Abbeymead

Barnwood

Barton

Eastgate

Hucclecote

Kingsholm

Linden

Longlevens

Matson

Podsmead

Quedgeley

Tuffley

Westgate

References

1998 English local elections
1998
1990s in Gloucestershire